The 2007 FIBA Europe Under-20 Championship was the tenth edition of the FIBA Europe Under-20 Championship. The cities of Nova Gorica, in Slovenia, and Gorizia, in Italy, hosted the tournament. Serbia won their first title with that name (they won the 1998 Championship as Yugoslavia and the 2006 Championship as Serbia and Montenegro).

Macedonia and Hungary were relegated to Division B.

Teams

Squads

Preliminary round
The sixteen teams were allocated in four groups of four teams each.

Group A

Group B

Group C

Group D

Qualifying round
The twelve teams were allocated in two groups of six teams each. The results of the games between the teams from the same group in the preliminary round were taken into account for the ranking in this round.

Group E

Group F

Classification round

Group G

Knockout stage

9th–12th playoffs

5th–8th playoffs

Championship

Final standings

Stats leaders

Points

Rebounds

Assists

All-Tournament Team
  Miloš Teodosić
  Alexey Shved
  Luigi Datome
  Dragan Labović
  Xavi Rey

References

FIBA Archive
FIBA Europe Archive

FIBA U20 European Championship
2007–08 in European basketball
2007–08 in Slovenian basketball
2007–08 in Italian basketball
International youth basketball competitions hosted by Slovenia
International youth basketball competitions hosted by Italy